Cruz Azul Femenil is a Mexican professional women's football club based in Mexico City that competes in the Liga MX Femenil . The club has been the women's section of Cruz Azul since 2017.

Personnel

Coaching staff

Source: Liga MX Femenil

Players

Current squad
As of 13 January 2023

References

 
Liga MX Femenil teams
Football clubs in Hidalgo (state)
Association football clubs established in 2017
Women's association football clubs in Mexico
2017 establishments in Mexico